Personal Attention is the ninth album, by R&B singer Stacy Lattisaw, released on January 21, 1988 on Motown Records. It  features backing vocals by Johnny Gill, Karyn White, Howard Hewett, David Lasley and Lynn Davis. It includes a cover of the Marvin Gaye and Tammi Terrell song, "Ain't No Mountain High Enough".

Track listing with credits
Side A
"Personal Attention" (Brownmark)
Recording and mixing engineer – John Black
Sound engineer – Richard Markowitz
Produced and arranged by – Brownmark
Love Town (Vincent Brantley)
Backing vocals – Karyn White, Vincent Brantley
Production coordinator – Dina Andrews
Mixing engineer – Taavi Mote, Vincent Brantley
Recording Engineer – Joel Soifer, Vincent Brantley
Producer, arranged by, instruments – Vincent Brantley
"Let Me Take You Down" (Lou Pace and The Blitz)
Strings arranged and conducted – Juanito Márquez
Bass – Reginald White
Drums – Harry King
Assistant engineer – Frank Cesarano, Mike Strick, Paul Van Puffelen
Keyboards – David Rosenthal, Emridge Jones
Producer – Lou Pace
Programmed by – David Rosenthal
Recorded and mixed by – Jerrold Soloman
Saxophone – Ed Calle
"Ain't No Mountain High Enough" (Duet with Howard Hewett) (Nickolas Ashford, Valerie Simpson)
Rhythm and vocals arranged by – Jerry Knight
Backing vocals – Howard Hewett, Stacy Lattisaw
Mixing engineer – Darren Klein
Recording engineer – Csaba Petocz
Producer, instruments, programmed by – Aaron Zigman, Jerry Knight
"He's Got a Hold On Me" (Brownmark, Michael Ligon, Stacy Lattisaw, William Beall)
Backing vocals – Brownmark, Cynthia Johnson, Mersadies
Recording and mixing engineer – John Black
Sound engineer – Richard Markowitz
Producer, arranged by – Brownmark
Saxophone – Kenneth Holmen
Side B 
"Find Another Lover" (Brownmark)
Recording and mixing engineer – John Black
Sound engineer – Richard Markowitz
Produced and arranged by – Brownmark
Changes (Bennie Melton, Jr., Brownmark, Joseph Lattisaw, Jr., Stacy Lattisaw)
Backing vocals – Brownmark, Johnny Gill
Recording and mixing engineer – John Black
Sound engineer – Richard Markowitz
Producer, arranged by – Brownmark
Saxophone – Robert Martin
"Every Drop of Your Love" (Alex Brown, Ron Kersey)
Arranged by [Background] – Alex Brown
Backing vocals – Alex Brown, Lynn Davis, Phillip Ingram, Sandy Simmons
Engineer [mixing] [second] – Jim Champagne
Engineer [recording] [second] – Glen Kurtz
Engineer [remix] [second] – Jim Dineen
Guitar – Paul Jackson Jr.
Producer, arranged by, Kkeyboards – Ron Kersey
Programmed by – Aaron Smith
Recorded by, mixed by – Hill Swimmer
"Call Me" (Lou Pace, The Blitz)
Backing vocals – Emeridge Jones, Gary King, Stacy Lattisaw
Bass – Gary King
Drum programming – Jimmy Bralower
Assistant engineer – Frank Cesarano, Mike Strick, Paul Van Puffelen
Keyboards – David Rosenthal, Emeridge Jones
Percussion – Harry King
Producer – Lou Pace
Rap – Reginald White
Recorded by, mixed by – Jerrold Solomon
"Electronic Eyes" (Alex Brown, Ron Kersey)
Arranged by [background] – Alex Brown
Backing vocals – Alex Brown, Carl Carwell, David Lasley, Lynn Davis
Bass – Melvin Davis
Engineer [mixing] [second] – Jim Champagne
Engineer [recording] [second] – Glen Kurtz
Guitar – Paul Jackson Jr.
Producer, Arranged by, Keyboards – Ron Kersey
Programmed by – Aaron Smith
Recorded by, mixed by – Hill Swimmer

Charts

Weekly charts

Year-end charts

References

External links
Personal Attention by Stacy Lattisaw at MusicBrainz

1988 albums
Motown albums
Stacy Lattisaw albums
New jack swing albums